Philippe Hervé (born 16 April 1959) is a French water polo player. He competed in the men's tournament at the 1988 Summer Olympics.

References

1959 births
Living people
French male water polo players
Olympic water polo players of France
Water polo players at the 1988 Summer Olympics
Sportspeople from Le Havre